Brentwood Magazine is a magazine edited by Jenny Peters that covers fashion, travel, and entertainment news for Los Angeles and beyond. It is a full-color magazine, published six times a year. The magazine describes itself as "Southern California's affluent entertainment magazine." Brentwood Magazine is distributed to homes in West Los Angeles, Beverly Hills, Brentwood, Bel Air, Westwood, Pacific Palisades, Malibu, Santa Monica, West Hollywood, Marina del Ray and Venice Beach. Brentwood Magazine is also available at Los Angeles newsstands or by subscription.

Troy Linger was the founder and original publisher of Brentwood, and he launched the magazine in 1994. In 2002 he sold Brentwood to ValCom Inc., based in Valencia, California, on undisclosed terms.

References

External links
 Official website

1994 establishments in California
Bimonthly magazines published in the United States
Entertainment magazines published in the United States
Local interest magazines published in the United States
Magazines established in 1994
Magazines published in Los Angeles